The Brodsky Quartet is a British string quartet, formed in Middlesbrough, North Yorkshire, in 1972 as the "Cleveland Quartet". Only Ian Belton and Jacqueline Thomas remain as original members.

In addition to performing classical music, and in particular the string quartet repertoire of Haydn, Beethoven, Schubert, Bartók and Shostakovich, they have collaborated with such  rock and pop figures as Björk, Elvis Costello and Paul McCartney. They perform the "Strings" on Björk's Family Tree box set. This material mostly comes from concerts Björk and the Brodsky gave at London's Union Chapel in December 1999.

The quartet used to perform standing up. Jacqueline Thomas had her cello fitted with an extra-long spike and used a small stool under her left foot, so that the instrument could rest against her bent knee.

In May 1998 the Brodsky Quartet was presented with a Royal Philharmonic Society Award for an outstanding contribution to the world of music.

As well as their performance and recording work, the Brodsky Quartet is currently the visiting quartet at the Royal Scottish Academy of Music and Drama, where they regularly tutor young chamber music ensembles who attend the academy. For fourteen years they taught and performed at the Dartington International Summer School.

The Brodsky Quartet is not the first quartet of that name. They are named for Russian violinist Adolph Brodsky (1851–1929), who himself had led two quartets himself under that name. In 1918 Edward Elgar dedicated his String Quartet in E minor, Op. 83 to the 2nd Adolph Brodsky quartet.

In 2016, the Quartet recorded an album with Australian Katie Noonan called With Love and Fury, which re-imagines the poetry of Judith Wright.

In 2019 it was announced that Daniel Rowland was leaving the post of leader and that Gina McCormack would replace him from May 2019.

In May 2021 it was announced that Gina McCormack was stepping down as leader and that Krysia Osostowicz would replace her.

Members
1972–1982
 Michael Thomas
 Ian Belton
 Alexander Robertson
 Jacqueline Thomas

1982–1999
 Michael Thomas
 Ian Belton
 Paul Cassidy
 Jacqueline Thomas

1999–2007
 Andrew Haveron
 Ian Belton
 Paul Cassidy
 Jacqueline Thomas

2007–2019
 Daniel Rowland,
 Ian Belton
 Paul Cassidy
 Jacqueline Thomas

2019–2021
 Gina McCormack, violin
 Ian Belton, violin
 Paul Cassidy, viola
 Jacqueline Thomas, cello

2021-
 Krysia Osostowicz, violin
 Ian Belton, violin
 Paul Cassidy, viola
 Jacqueline Thomas, cello

Awards and nominations

ARIA Music Awards
The ARIA Music Awards is an annual awards ceremony that recognises excellence, innovation, and achievement across all genres of Australian music. They commenced in 1987. 

! 
|-
| 2016
| With Love and Fury (with Katie Noonan)
| Best Classical Album
| 
| 
|-

References

External links 
 

English string quartets
Musical groups established in 1972